Tomato paste is a thick paste made by cooking tomatoes for several hours to reduce the water content, straining out the seeds and skins, and cooking the liquid again to reduce the base to a thick, rich concentrate. It is used to impart an intense tomato flavour to a variety of dishes, such as pasta, soups and braised meat. It is used heavily in Italian cultured food.

By contrast, tomato purée is a liquid with a thinner consistency than tomato paste, while tomato sauce is even thinner in consistency.

History and traditions 
Tomato paste is traditionally made in parts of Sicily, southern Italy and Malta by spreading out a much-reduced tomato sauce on wooden boards that are set outdoors under the hot August sun to dry the paste until it is thick enough, when it is scraped up and held together in a richly-colored dark ball. Today, this artisan product is harder to find than the thinner industrial version. Commercial production uses tomatoes with thick pericarp walls and lower overall moisture; these are very different from tomatoes typically found in a supermarket.

Tomato paste became commercially available in the early 20th century.

Regional differences 
In the UK, tomato paste is also referred to as concentrate.

In the US, tomato paste is simply concentrated tomato solids (no seeds or skin), sometimes with added sweetener (high fructose corn syrup), and with a standard of identity (in the Code of Federal Regulations, see 21 CFR 155.191).  Tomato purée has a lower tomato soluble solids requirement, the cutoff being 24%. For comparison, typical fresh round tomatoes have a soluble solid content of 3.5–5.5% (refractometric Brix), while cherry tomatoes have double the amount.

Europeans have a preference to tomato paste with salt, while some Middle Easterners, such as Israelis, prefer tomato paste with sugar.

Uses 

Tomato paste is added to dishes to impart an intense flavour, particularly the natural umami flavour found in tomatoes. Examples of dishes in which tomato paste may be commonly used include pasta sauces, soups, and braised meat. The paste is typically added early in the cooking process and sautéed to achieve caramelization.

Based on the manufacturing conditions, the paste can be the basis for making ketchup or reconstituted tomato juice:

See also 
 Chili sauce and paste
 List of tomato dishes

References

Food ingredients
Tomato products
Food paste